Dorstenia bahiensis is a plant species in the family Moraceae which is native to eastern Brazil.

References

bahiensis
Plants described in 1846
Flora of Brazil